The CS 36 is a Canadian sailboat, that was designed by Raymond Wall as a cruiser and first built in 1978.

Production
The design was built by CS Yachts in Canada who completed 400 boats between 1978 and 1987. The boat was a commercial success and 60 were sold in the first month it was produced.

It was replaced in the production line after nearly a year overlap in production by the CS 36 Merlin designed by Tony Castro. After the introduction of the CS 36 Merlin the CS 36 was referred to as the CS 36 Traditional.

Design

The CS 36 is a recreational keelboat, built predominantly of fiberglass, with a balsa wood-cored deck. It has a masthead sloop rig, an internally-mounted spade-type/transom-hung rudder and a fixed fin keel or optional shoal draft keel. The fin keel version displaces  and carries  of lead ballast. The shoal draft version displaces  and carries  of lead ballast.

The boat has a PHRF racing average handicap of 126 with a high of 135 and low of 123.

Operational history
In a review of the CS 36 Traditional, Michael McGoldrick wrote, "the CS 36 is very much a traditional boat in the broader sense of the word insofar that it exemplifies the larger sailboats that were being built in the 1970s and early 1980s. This boat doesn't seem to have any design feature which is particularly outstanding, but everything comes together to produce a timeless design with pleasing proportions."

A 2017 used boat review in The Spin Sheet noted, "I generally don’t comment on the aesthetics of designs but the CS 36 is one of the best looking designs of the era and I think it's worthy of some comment on why. Aesthetically, the most important line of any design is the sheer line, and it would be hard to improve on the sheer Wall has drawn. If it were more curved, it would look exaggerated; less curved, and it would appear hogged or raised in the middle, as the boat normally heels under sail. The overhangs at the bow and stern are well balanced and the diagonal lines all complement one another. The cabin house and cockpit combings are styled so that they blend into the deck as if they were planned, not plopped down as an afterthought. The freeboard is necessarily high in order to provide ample headroom, but Wall has drawn an accent stripe below the sheer at just the right width and location to disguise the elevated freeboard without it becoming too prominent a feature. I'm not particularly fond of CS’s practice of finishing the transom to match the feature stripe color, but this is a minor point and easily remedied."

See also
List of sailing boat types

Similar sailboats
Alberg 37
Baltic 37
Bayfield 36
C&C 36-1
C&C 37
Catalina 36
Columbia 36
Coronado 35
Crealock 37
Dickerson 37
Dockrell 37
Endeavour 37
Ericson 36
Frigate 36
Hinterhoeller F3
Hunter 36
Hunter 36-2
Hunter 36 Legend
Hunter 36 Vision
Invader 36
Islander 36
Nonsuch 36
Nor'Sea 37
Portman 36
Seidelmann 37
Vancouver 36 (Harris)
Watkins 36
Watkins 36C

References

External links

Keelboats
1970s sailboat type designs
Sailing yachts
Sailboat type designs by British designers
Sailboat types built in Canada
Sailboat types built by CS Yachts